Clint Hill (born 26 April 1981) is a former professional athlete rugby league footballer who played for the Wests Tigers.

References

External links
RLP Profile

Australian rugby league players
Wests Tigers players
Living people
1981 births
Place of birth missing (living people)